is a near-Earth Asteroid belonging to the Apollo group. It was first discovered on 26 November 2005. The asteroid will pass within 330,000 km (0.9 lunar distances) from the Earth on 28 May 2065. It has an absolute magnitude (H) of 20.68. It is estimated to be 190 to 250 meters in diameter. It was removed from the Sentry Risk Table on 1 July 2006.

References

External links 
 
 
 

Minor planet object articles (unnumbered)

e
20051126